Walasgala is a town on the far south coast of Sri Lanka

Transport 

In 2007, a railway line is being built to and through the town.

See also 

 List of railway stations in Sri Lanka

References 

Populated places in Southern Province, Sri Lanka